Polypoetes picaria is a moth of the family Notodontidae. It is endemic
to eastern Peru and northern Bolivia at an altitude of approximately 3,000 meters.

References

Moths described in 1904
Notodontidae of South America